Matthew Alexander Vickers (born 24 September 1983) is a British politician serving as the member of Parliament (MP) for Stockton South since 2019. Vickers was appointed Deputy Chairman of the Conservative Party in July 2022, serving alongside Nickie Aiken, Lee Anderson, and Luke Hall since 2023.

Early life
Vickers was born in University Hospital of North Tees to local business owners Hilary and Alexander Vickers.  He grew up in Stockton-on-Tees and has three brothers. He studied law and business management at Teesside University and previously worked at Woolworths and Home Bargains including in a management role.

Local political career
Vickers represented Hartburn ward on the Stockton-on-Tees Borough Council from May 2015 until April 2021, when he stood down. During his tenure as a councillor Vickers was the leader of the Conservative group on the council. He campaigned against overdevelopment and for suitable parking facilities. During this period he had faced some criticism due to his ongoing representation as a councillor whilst an elected MP, being labelled as a "part time MP" by other councillors from the region. In response to criticism, Vickers highlighted how he did not claim any expenses and donated all his councillor salary to three local charities, which helped veterans, those suffering with dementia and homelessness in the constituency. At the time of his departure as a councillor, his allowance amounted to a minimum of £9,300 per year. One of the recipients was The Teesside Dementia Link Services who received a £500 donation from his councillor allowance. The two remaining recipients of the allowance donations are unknown.

Vickers was the Conservative candidate for Cleveland Police and Crime Commissioner in 2016. Between 2009 and 2019, he was the constituency agent for Richmond (Yorks). Vickers initially worked with William Hague. Following Hague’s retirement, Vickers helped to run Rishi Sunak's successful general election campaigns in 2015 and 2017.

Parliamentary career
He was elected as MP for Stockton South at the 2019 general election with a majority of 5,260. The seat had previously been held by Labour's Paul Williams. From March 2020 to 16 January 2021, Vickers sat on the Committee on the Future Relationship with the European Union.

On 19 November 2020, Vickers backed the home secretary, Priti Patel, after a Cabinet Office inquiry found evidence that Patel had breached the ministerial code following bullying allegations, publicly supporting Patel: "[Patel] is one of the most hardworking Home Secretaries this country has had."

Vickers, along with 22 other MPs, wrote to Attorney General Suella Braverman in August 2020 requesting that the killing of police officer Andrew Harper case, where the perpetrators were convicted of manslaughter,  be referred to the Court of Appeal under the unduly lenient sentence scheme as he supported a life imprisonment.

He has been a member of the Petitions Committee since 1 March 2021.

On 27 September 2021, Vickers wrote a letter to the House of Commons director of catering requesting that the Teesside dish the chicken Parmo be added to the menu. After a successful campaign, the Parmo was added to the menu for a short period of time.

He was a member of the Levelling Up, Housing and Communities Committee from 19 October 2021 to 21 June 2022.

In November 2021, Vickers secured the backing of broadcaster and former politician Michael Portillo for his bid to have the headquarters of the newly announced Great British Railways located in Stockton-on-Tees following the announcement that the headquarters would be determined through a public consultation and vote.

Vickers was a member of the Home Affairs Select Committee and the Justice Select Committee from 15 March to 27 June 2022.

Following a rebellion in which 36 MPs signed Vickers' amendment to the Police, Crime, Sentencing and Courts Act 2022, the secretary of state for justice pledged to introduce measures to make assaults on those performing a duty to the public a statutory aggravating factor in the form of Lords Amendment 104. Vickers subsequently hailed this as "a landmark victory for shop workers and retail staff across the country".

In June 2022, during the vote of no confidence in the Conservative Party leadership of Boris Johnson, Vickers publicly supported Johnson. 

On 13 June 2022, Vickers was appointed Parliamentary Private Secretary to the Home Office ministerial team, alongside Luke Evans.

In July 2022, Vickers was appointed Deputy Chairman of the Conservative Party.

References

External links

1983 births
Living people
Conservative Party (UK) councillors
Conservative Party (UK) MPs for English constituencies
Councillors in County Durham
People from Stockton-on-Tees
UK MPs 2019–present